Ferry Piekart (born 1974) is a Dutch author of children's non-fiction books. His Playing With Stuff – Outrageous Games with Ordinary Objects was published in the United States in 2004 by Kane/Miller Book Publishers.

Biography
Ferry Piekart is a Rotterdam resident. He studied journalism and cultural anthropology, and began his career in the Netherlands writing popular-science articles for Dutch magazines. He later began writing articles and stories for children's magazines. Playing With Stuff – Outrageous Games with Ordinary Objects was his first children's book. His motto is "The truth is just what you believe in."

Bibliography
Paf, af! – Spelletjes met spulletjes (2002)
Waar komt vandaag vandaan? – Over de geschiedenis van alledaagse dingen (2004)
Playing With Stuff – Outrageous Games with Ordinary Objects (including some extra games, 2004)
Pleetime (2007)

References

Sources
Ferry Piekart biography by Gottmer (Dutch)
Ferry Piekart biography by Kane/Miller
Official website of Ferry Piekart (Dutch)

1974 births
Living people
Dutch children's writers
Writers from Rotterdam